Someone to Love is a 1928 American silent comedy film directed by F. Richard Jones and written by Ray Harris, Monte Brice, Keene Thompson, George Marion Jr. and Alice Duer Miller. The film stars Charles "Buddy" Rogers, Mary Brian, William Austin, Jack Oakie, James Kirkwood, Sr., Mary Alden and Frank Reicher. The film was released on December 1, 1928, by Paramount Pictures.

Cast 
Charles "Buddy" Rogers as William Shelby
Mary Brian	as Joan Kendricks
William Austin as Aubrey Weems
Jack Oakie as Michael Casey
James Kirkwood, Sr. as Mr. Kendricks
Mary Alden	as Harriet Newton
Frank Reicher as Simmons

Preservation status
This film is now lost.

References

External links 
 
 

1928 films
1920s English-language films
Silent American comedy films
1928 comedy films
Paramount Pictures films
Films directed by F. Richard Jones
American black-and-white films
Lost American films
American silent feature films
1928 lost films
Lost comedy films
1920s American films